"Blue Blue Day" is a 1958 single written and originally performed by Don Gibson.

Chart performance
"Blue Blue Day" went to number one for two weeks on the Country & Western Best Seller chart and remained on that chart for a total of six months.  The song also was Don Gibson's second of four Top 40 entries, where it peaked at number twenty.

Other versions
Wilburn Brothers - version peaked at number 14 on the Billboard charts in 1961.
Anne Murray - included in her album Country Croonin' (2002)
Connie Francis and Hank Williams Jr. - on the album Connie Francis and Hank Williams Jr. Sing Great Country Favorites (1964)
Dean Martin - for his album Dean "Tex" Martin: Country Style (1963)
James Intveld - for his album James Intveld (1995)
The Kendalls - version peaked at number 69 on the Billboard Hot Country Singles chart in 1989.
Val Doonican (1963).
The Spotnicks recorded a version which reached No. 1 in Norway in 1963.

References

1958 singles
1989 singles
Don Gibson songs
The Kendalls songs
RCA Records singles
1958 songs
Songs written by Don Gibson
The Crickets songs